Hayrullah Şahinkaya (born 1 February 1934) is a Turkish wrestler. He competed at the 1960 Summer Olympics and the 1964 Summer Olympics.

References

External links
 

1934 births
Living people
Turkish male sport wrestlers
Olympic wrestlers of Turkey
Wrestlers at the 1960 Summer Olympics
Wrestlers at the 1964 Summer Olympics
People from Amasya
World Wrestling Championships medalists